Harald Hansen may refer to:

 Harald Hansen (businessman) (1835–1902), businessman and politician
 Harald Hansen (footballer) (1884–1927), footballer
 Harald Hansen (gymnast), Norwegian gymnast
 Harald Hansen (painter) (1890–1967), Danish painter